15 éxitos (English: 15 Hits) is a greatest hits album by Mexican singer Flor Silvestre, released in 1984 by Musart Records. The 1989 CD reissue and most recent releases of this compilation include "Mi destino fue quererte" as the first track.

1984 LP track listing
Side one

Side two

1989 CD track listing

References

External links
 15 éxitos at AllMusic

1984 greatest hits albums
1989 greatest hits albums
Flor Silvestre albums
Musart Records albums
Spanish-language compilation albums